The 2015–16 EHF Champions League was the 56th edition of Europe's premier club handball tournament and the 23rd edition under the current EHF Champions League format. FC Barcelona Lassa was the defending champion.

Vive Tauron Kielce defeated MVM Veszprém in the final to capture their first title.

Overview

Team allocation
Twenty-seven teams were directly qualified for the group stage.

TH = Title holders

Competition format
In March 2014, EHF introduced a new competition format.

Twenty-eight teams participated in the competition, divided in four groups. Groups A and B played with eight teams each, in a round robin, home and away format. The top team in each group qualified directly for the quarter-finals, the bottom two in each group dropped out of the competition and the remaining 10 teams qualified for the first knock-out phase.

In groups C and D, six teams played in each group in a round robin format, playing both home and away. The top two teams in each group then met in a ‘semi-final’ play-off, with the two winners going through to the first knock-out phase. The remaining teams dropped out of the competition.

Knock-out Phase 1 (Last 12)
12 teams played home and away in the first knock-out phase, with the 10 teams qualified from groups A and B and the two teams qualified from groups C and D.

Knock-out Phase 2 (Quarterfinals)
The six winners of the matches in the first knock-out phase joined with the winners of groups A and B to play home and away for the right to play in the VELUX EHF FINAL4.

Final four
The culmination of the season, the VELUX EHF FINAL4, with the four top teams from the competition competing for the title.

Round and draw dates
All draws held at the European Handball Federation headquarters in Vienna, Austria.

Qualification stage
There was no draw held. The four teams played a semifinal and final to determine the last participant. Matches were played on 5 and 6 September 2015. RK Banja Luka organized the tournament.

Bracket

All times are local (UTC+2).

Semifinals

Third place game

Final

Group stage

The draw for the group stage was held on 26 June 2015, 20:00 CEST, in the Vienna city centre. The 28 teams were drawn into four groups, two containing eight teams (Groups A and B) and two containing six teams (Groups C and D). The only restriction was that teams from the same national association could not face each other in the same group. Since Germany qualified three teams, the lowest seeded side (Flensburg-Handewitt) had necessarily to be drawn with one of the other two.

In each group, teams played against each other in a double round-robin format, with home and away matches. The matchdays are 16–20 September, 23–27 September, 30 September–4 October, 7–11 October, 14–18 October, 21–25 October, 11–15 November, 18–22 November, 25–29 November and 2–6 December 2015. For Groups A and B, additional matchdays include 10–14 February, 17–21 February, 24–28 February and 2–6 March 2016.

After completion of the group stage matches, the teams advancing to the knockout stage were determined in the following manner:

Groups A and B – the top team qualified directly for the quarter-finals, and the five teams ranked 2nd–6th advanced to the first knockout round.
Groups C and D – the top two teams from both groups contested a playoff to determine the last two sides joining the 10 teams from Groups A and B in the first knockout round.

Group A

Group B

Group C

Group D

Playoffs

Knockout stage

The first-place team from the preliminary groups A and B advanced to the quarterfinals, while the second through sixth place teams advanced to the round 16 alongside the playoff winners.

Round of 16

Quarterfinals

Final four

Final

Top goalscorers
Statistics exclude qualifying rounds.

Awards

The All-star team of the Champions League 2015/16:

See also
2015–16 EHF Cup
2015–16 EHF Challenge Cup

References

External links
Official website

 
EHF Champions League seasons
EHF Champions League
EHF Champions League